Asthena melanosticta is a moth in the family Geometridae. It is found in Taiwan.

References

Moths described in 1924
Asthena
Moths of Asia